Gairola is a clan of the Garhwali Sarola Brahmins and is also a toponymic surname from Gairoli, a village in the Chamoli district of Uttarakhand, India. In an earlier time period, Gairolas were believed to be astrologers and Raj-Purohits. Notable people with this surname include:

 P.L. Gairola, the chairman and Director of Dena Bank
 Tara Dutt Gairola, an Indian lawyer, author, and editor
 Ashok Gairola, senior corporate VP and has worked for companies like GE, IBM, Nokia

Notes

References

Citations

Surnames
Indian surnames
Surnames of Indian origin
Surnames of Hindustani origin
Hindu surnames
Himalayan peoples
Social groups of India
Social groups of Uttarakhand
Brahmin communities of Uttarakhand
Toponymic surnames
People from Chamoli district